Seated Woman is a bronze sculpture by Henry Moore, catalogued as LH 435. Examples are in the Hirshhorn Museum and Sculpture Garden, Washington, D.C., and Nelson-Atkins Museum of Art in Kansas City.

See also
List of sculptures by Henry Moore
List of public art in Washington, D.C., Ward 2

References

External links
Bluffton
Washington DC - Hirshhorn Museum and Sculpture Garden - Sea… | Flickr

Sculptures by Henry Moore
Sculptures of women
1957 sculptures
Sculptures of women in Washington, D.C.
Hirshhorn Museum and Sculpture Garden
Sculptures of the Smithsonian Institution
Bronze sculptures in Washington, D.C.
Nude sculptures in Washington, D.C.
Outdoor sculptures in Washington, D.C.
Sculptures of women in Missouri
Bronze sculptures in Missouri
Sculptures of the Nelson-Atkins Museum of Art